Robert Plunket (b. Dublin 11 May 1802  - d. Monkstown 13 May 1867) was an Anglican priest in Ireland during the 19th-century.

Burke was  educated at Trinity College, Dublin. He was Archdeacon of Killala from 1847 to 1850; and Dean of Tuam from then until his death.

Notes

Alumni of Trinity College Dublin
Deans of Tuam
19th-century Irish Anglican priests
Christian clergy from Dublin (city)
1802 births
1867 deaths
Archdeacons of Killala